Chaeturichthys is a genus of gobies native to the western Pacific Ocean.

Species
There are currently two recognized species in this genus:
 Chaeturichthys jeoni Shibukawa & Iwata, 2013
 Chaeturichthys stigmatias J. Richardson, 1844 (Branded goby)

References

Gobionellinae